The G class (Turkish: Gabya sınıfı fırkateyn(ler)) is one of the frigate classes of the Turkish Navy. They are extensively modernized versions of ex- guided-missile frigates of the US Navy, mainly designed for air defense with a weapons configuration that is optimized for general warfare.

Modernization
The G-class frigates have undergone a major modernization program which included the retrofitting of a Turkish digital combat management system named GENESIS (Gemi Entegre Savaş İdare Sistemi). The system was designed and implemented jointly by the Turkish Navy and HAVELSAN, a Turkish electronic hardware systems and software company. The first GENESIS upgraded ship was delivered in 2007, and the last delivery is scheduled for 2011.

The GENESIS advanced combat management system includes the following characteristics and abilities:
 A modern and reliable system
 High performance
 Open architecture
 Capacity of tracking more than 1,000 tactical targets
 Modern digital sensor data fusion
 Automatic threat evaluation
 Weapon engagement opportunities
 Link-16/22 system integration

The modernization program also includes:
 The addition of an 8-cell Mk-41 VLS for Evolved Sea Sparrow, including the upgrade of the Mk-92 fire control system by Lockheed Martin
 The retrofitting of a new advanced SMART-S Mk2 3D air search radar to replace AN/SPS-49 
 The addition of a new long range sonar

The Mk-41 VLS will be fitted in front of the Mk.13 launchers, similar to their installation on the s of the Royal Australian Navy, which are Australian-built derivatives of the Oliver Hazard Perry-class frigates. TCG Gediz became the first ship in the class to receive the Mk 41 VLS installation.

The "short hull" ex-Perry class frigates that are currently being operated by the Turkish Navy were modified with the ASIST landing platform system at the Istanbul Naval Shipyard, so that they can accommodate the S-70B Seahawk helicopter.

Ships
  ex-
  ex-
  ex-
  ex-
  ex-
  ex-
  ex-
  ex-

In addition the ex- was sold to the Turkish Navy as a parts hulk

See also
List of major surface ships of the Turkish Navy

References

External links

Official Turkish Navy Website 
Turkish Navy
Turkishnavy.net: First Turkish Perry with the Mk-41 VLS

 
Frigate classes